Penang Toy Museum is a toy museum located at 1370, Mk 2, Teluk Bahang (Next to SJK (C) Eok Hua School), Penang, Malaysia. With more than 110,000 toys, dolls and other collectible items, it is the largest toy museum in the world. The 1,000 square meters museum, opened in 2005, was also recognised by the Malaysian Book of Records as the first toy museum in the country. The museum is visited by an estimated 100,000 visitors each year.

Schedule
Operating Hours: 9am to 6pm daily      Contact: 012-4602096

History
The museum was founded by an engineer, Mr. Loh Lean Cheng. He got his inspiration while visiting the London Toy and Model Museum. The first toy that he bought back in 1973 was a Popeye doll.

Museum Sections
 Cave of Dinosaurs
 Chamber of Comic Book Heroes
 Chamber of Fantasy
 Chamber of Horrors
 Chamber of Monsters
 Fields of Combat
 Hall of Beauties
 Hall of Cartoons
 Hall of Celebrities
 Hall of Rock Legends
 Hall of Virtual Reality
 Star Wars Collections

Collections
The museum features more than 110,000 toys and figures. There are another 30,000 toys that are kept in storage as the museum is not big enough to accommodate all of the toys. Some of the toys displayed in the museum were obtained direct from Hollywood.

The museum features a notable 1.8m-tall Japanese Gundam robot, which cost RM9000. Other life size figures include Batman, Indiana Jones, Iron Man, Jack Sparrow, King Kong, Kung Fu Panda, Lara Croft, Monsters, Inc. characters, Power Rangers, Sheriff Woody, Shrek, Silver Surfer, Spider-Man, Superman, WALL-E and others.

The toy collections include Disney's characters such as 101 Dalmatians, A Bug's Life, Lilo & Stitch, Peter Pan, Pinocchio, Snow White and the Seven Dwarfs, The Incredible Hulk, The Lion King and The Little Mermaid. Also featured are Barbie dolls, Doraemon, Dragon Ball, the Fantastic Four, Frankenstein, Garfield, the Hulk, Looney Tunes characters, Mr. Bean, Pokémon toys, Snoopy, Spider-Man, Superman, WWE figures, X-Men figures and others.

The walls and ceiling of the museum are decorated with an Egyptian theme, featuring Pharaoh and sphinx statues.

See also
 Malacca Toy Museum

References

External links 
 http://www.penang-hotels-review.com/2009/11/penang-toy-museum-map-and-address.html
 http://www.penangtoymuseum.com
 Penang Toy Museum | Virtual Malaysia

Museums in Penang
Toy museums
Tourist attractions in George Town, Penang